El Kouar or Mers el Koar is a settlement in Tangier-Assilah Prefecture, Morocco.

References

Populated places in Tanger-Tetouan-Al Hoceima